Harry Parker was a New Zealand tennis player who was active during the first two decades of the 20th century. 

Parker won the doubles title at the Australasian Championships, the future Australian Open, alongside Bill Gregg in 1907. He also reached two singles finals at the Australasian Championships in 1907 and 1913, and two doubles finals in 1906 and 1913. He reached the Wimbeldon Championships doubles final, alongside Stanley Doust in 1909, and the quarter finals alongside Anthony Wilding in 1905.

Grand Slam finals

Singles (2 runners-up)

Doubles (1 title, 3 runners-up)

References

External links
 

Australasian Championships (tennis) champions
New Zealand male tennis players
Grand Slam (tennis) champions in men's doubles
1873 births
1961 deaths